Lejops is a genus of hoverflies, closely related to the genera Helophilus, Quichuana and Mallota.

This genus formerly contained the following subgenera which have been elevated to genus level: Anasimyia, Eurimyia, Asemosyrphus, Lunomyia, Polydontomyia, and Arctosyrphus. The species of these genera are sometimes treated as species of Lejops.

Species
These three species are members of the genus Lejops.

 Lejops barbiellinii (Ceresa, 1934) - Brazil
 Lejops pilosus (Hunter, 1897)
 Lejops vittatus (Meigen, 1822) - Europe and Asia

References

Diptera of Europe
Diptera of North America
Diptera of South America
Diptera of Australasia
Eristalinae
Hoverfly genera
Taxa named by Camillo Rondani